"Nobody's Perfect" is a song by American recording artist Miley Cyrus, credited as her character Hannah Montana from the eponymous television series. It was released on May 15, 2007 by Walt Disney Records as the lead single from Hannah Montana 2 (2007), the accompanying soundtrack album for its second season. Written by Matthew Gerrard and Robbie Nevil and produced by Gerrard, "Nobody's Perfect" discusses the importance of overcoming mistakes; it is heavily based on synthpop musical styles.

Contemporary music critics spoke favorably of "Nobody's Perfect" in their reviews, and were appreciative of its overall production. The track peaked at number 27 on the U.S. Billboard Hot 100; by exceeding sales of 906,000 copies as of October 2010, it has additionally become the most successful track from the Hannah Montana franchise. A live performance of Cyrus performing the track as Montana serves as the accompanying music video for the track; it was broadcast first on Disney Channel, although it was later included in the Vevo catalog. The song was also performed during Cyrus' headlining Best of Both Worlds Tour (2007–08).

Background and composition

In Hannah Montana, Miley Cyrus portrays the character Miley Stewart, a teenager who lives the secret double life as the pop star Hannah Montana. She stated that "most songs for the first season reflect the show, with Miley or Hannah making sure the other doesn't get caught or whatever," opining that the tracks provided series producers with the opportunity to "make sure that everyone understood the characters". By comparison, Cyrus described material used during the second season as "more speaking out to the fans."

"Nobody's Perfect" was written and produced by Matthew Gerrard; he additionally oversaw its mixing and programming, and performed the guitar, bass, and keyboards. Greg Critchley plated the drums, while Marco Luciana was responsible for the keyboards and Ashley Sauning contributed the background vocals. "Nobody's Perfect" appears as the second track on Hannah Montana 2 with a duration of three minutes and twenty seconds. It is written in the key of C-minor with Cyrus' vocals spanning two octaves from C4 to D5. The song was described by Allmusic as "synth-driven pop", and discusses the importance of overcoming mistakes.

Release
Before being released as the lead single from Hannah Montana 2 on May 15, 2007, "Nobody's Perfect" was included on the reissued two-disc special edition of the original soundtrack Hannah Montana (2006). Within the Hannah Montana storyline, "Nobody's Perfect" was written by Miley's father Robby Stewart; it is first heard in the episode "Get Down, Study-udy-udy" during the second season, where Miley reworks the song into the "Bone Dance" as a way of helping her study for a biology mid-term exam. A live performance of Cyrus performing the track as Montana acts as an accompanying music video for the track; it was initially released on July 3, 2007, although it was reissued through Vevo on December 10, 2010. It was also performed during Cyrus' headlining Best of Both Worlds Tour (2007–08).

Reception
"Nobody's Perfect" received generally favorable reviews from contemporary music critics. Writing for AllMusic, Heather Phares appreciated the incorporation of "shiny, synth-driven pop", which she credited with "[making] the first soundtrack a hit." Shirley Halperin from Entertainment Weekly shared a similar sentiment, describing it as "pure pop candy". Bob Waliszewski and Bob Smithouser from Plugged In classified "Nobody's Perfect" as "pro-social content", where "rather than [beating] herself up over mistakes, the singer acknowledges that 'Nobody's Perfect'" through the lyrics "Everybody has those days" and "You live and you learn it". "Nobody's Perfect" charted at number 27 on the U.S. Billboard Hot 100, and reached numbers 14 and 25 on the Billboard Digital Songs and Pop 100 charts, respectively. As of October 2010, the track has sold 906,000 copies in the United States, becoming the most successful song from the Hannah Montana franchise. "Nobody's Perfect" also charted at numbers 73 and 87 on the Hot Canadian Digital Singles and Australian ARIA Charts, respectively.

Credits and personnel
Credits adapted from the liner notes of Hannah Montana 2.
Recording
Mastered at Capitol Mastering (Hollywood, California)

Personnel
Greg Critchley – drums
Matthew Gerrard – songwriter, producer, mixing, guitar, bass, keyboards, programming
Marco Luciana – keyboards
Hannah Montana – lead vocals
Robbie Nevil – songwriter
Ashley Sauning – background vocals

Charts

Certification

Release history

References

2007 singles
Hannah Montana songs
Songs written by Matthew Gerrard
Songs written by Robbie Nevil
Walt Disney Records singles
Hannah Montana
2007 songs
Songs from television series
Song recordings produced by Matthew Gerrard